Baranagore Ramakrishna Mission Ashrama High School (H.S.) (BRKMAHS;) is a senior secondary boys' school in the district North 24 Parganas of West Bengal, India. The school was founded in 1912, and is located at the northern outskirt of Kolkata, on the banks of the river Ganges (Hoogly). The school is run by the Baranagar Ramakrishna Mission Ashrama Authority under the guidance of Ramakrishna Mission at Belur Math (taken over in 1924). Based on its performance of the students in the Xth standard board examination, the school is considered one of the very best schools in West Bengal. Department of Tourism (West Bengal) listed it as one of the tourist spots of West Bengal.

Emblem

Designed and explained by Swami Vivekananda in his own words:
The wavy waters in the picture are symbolic of Karma; the lotus, of Bhakti; and the rising-sun, of Jnana. The encircling serpent is indicative of Yoga and the awakened Kundalini Shakti, while the swan in the picture stands for Paramatman (Supreme Self). Therefore, the idea of the picture is that by the union of Karma, Jnana, Bhakti and Yoga, the vision of Paramatman is obtained.

Establishment
The "Brahmananda Ramakrishna Mission" of the twentieth century is today's "Baranagar Ramakrishna Mission Ashrama". Then the twentieth century was in its childhood – the great hero and saint Vivekananda had elevated himself like a phoenix from the ashes – his divine preaching had enchanted the young mind. India was then under the British bondage. The British Government had already issued the order, of partition of Bengal in accordance with the divide and rule policy of The Lord Curzon. The air was being rented with the melodies of Rabindranath "Banglar Mati Banglar Jol" Bengal became turbulent and agitated like "Nataraj" with the waves of anti-partition movement and this turbulence had given birth to a number of brave dreamers who were inspired by the paradigm of Swami Vivekananda. Yogindnanata Tagore, a disciple of Swami Brahmananda (Rakhal Maharaj) – a brave soldier of the anti-British movement and an active member of Anushilan Samiti, set up an orphanage in the name of his preceptor at the house of Panjas at Alambazar in North Kolkata. In 1912 on the pious day of Akshaya Tritiya, the organisation started its journey with the name "Brahmananda Balakashrama".

History

1912–2018
Baranagore Ramakrishna Mission Ashrama High School has become an embodiment of the ideology 'service and welfare through education', since its initiation in 1912, on the auspicious day of Akshaya Tritiya. Since then, through selflessness and service to the mankind, this organization so successfully caters the spiritual genre, convened by Lord Sri Ramakrishna, in every possible way.

The foundation stone of this ashrama, as a "Brahmananda Balakashrama", was laid by Sri Yogindranath Tagore, an eminent freedom-fighter and disciple of Srimat Swami Brahmanandaji Maharaj, the first president of Ramakrishna Order. Later it was shifted into a one storied building adjacent to Jaikrishna Mitra Kalibari at Kutighat in the name of, "Baranagar Ramakrishna Ashrama for Orphan". Then, in 1924 the Ashrama was acquired by Belur Math as a branch centre and hence, renamed as "Ramakrishna Mission Ashrama, Baranagore". On 20 February 1928, by the patronage of the late zaminders of Narali, Jessore, the Ashrama procured a land of 8 bighas and 8 chhatak beside Gopal Lal Tagore Road. It was the same Akshaya Tritiya on 11 May 1929 the Ashrama was shifted to the plot.

The primary school, set up in the Ashrama premises in 1934, was sequentially upgraded to upper primary and then to lower secondary section in the year 1952. The multifaceted upper secondary wing of the institution was inaugurated in 1954 and it, henceforth, got the recognition of 'Madhyamik' (Secondary).

11 May 1998, on the auspicious Buddha Purnima, a parallel primary wing of the institution (from Class I to Class IV) was incepted under the jurisdiction of Ramakrishna Mission, Belur Math. This new segment was named "Ramakrishna Mission Centenary Primary School, Baranagore" and was inaugurated by Revered Srimat Swami Lokeshwaranandaji on the occasion of 'Centenary Celebration'.

2018–Present

After a prolonged yet rigorous effort of 42 years, this institution has been elevated to the Higher Secondary level in 2018 and education is being imparted through Bengali and English medium in this section. The first batch of Higher Secondary has come out of the school with flying colours in the pandemic-hit year of 2020.

Campus

Ashrama has a large and green campus. It contains a primary school section, secondary and higher secondary school section, libraries, three free coaching centres, a charitable homeopathic dispensary, a mobile medical unit, prayer hall, a temple, monk's quarters and playgrounds. A fibreglass relievo (17 ft x 22 ft) of Sri Ramakrishna's Monastic Disciples was inaugurated in Ramakrishna Mission Baranagar by Revered Swami Shivamayananda ji Maharaj on 15 March 2021.

Infrastructure

Secondary section

There are two secondary section buildings in the school campus, one for classes (V – VI) and the other for classes (VII – X). There are five sections in each of the classes from V – VIII and in IX and X there are four sections each.

Higher secondary section
 
There is one higher secondary section building in school campus for classes XI and XII. The building is named "Nivedita Bhawan" which was inaugurated by Swami Suhitananda ji maharaj on 14 May 2018.

Affiliations
Secondary section (V – X) is affiliated by West Bengal Board of Secondary Education and higher secondary section (XI – XII) is affiliated by West Bengal Council of Higher Secondary Education.

Academics

BRKMAHS started the Higher Secondary course, in commemoration of the 125th Anniversary of Swami Vivekananda's historic speech in the World Parliament of Religions at Chicago. Swami Suvirananda, General Secretary, Ramakrishna Math and Ramakrishna Mission, inaugurated the course in a programme at the Ashrama premises on 22 June 2018 evening.

, the curriculum of higher secondary section, affiliated by WBCHSE, consisted of Arts and Science streams.

Organisation structure

List of headmasters of Baranagore Ramakrishna Mission Ashrama High School according to their working period:

Student life

Academic
Students are highly influenced by the faith and philosophy of Ramakrishna at this school. Former student Shiboprosad Mukherjee said:

Social activities

Swachh Bharat Mission

BRKMAHS arranged an intensive cleaning programme Swachh Bharat Mission in the neighbouring locality on 30 June 2016, in accordance with the instruction given by the headquarters Belur Math. More than 600 students of standards VIII, IX and X actively participated in the programme under the guidance of monastic members and brahmacharies of the Ashrama and almost all the teaching and non-teaching staff of the high school.

COVID-19 relief services

BRKM is continuing the relief services to the families affected by the lockdown due to the COVID-19 pandemic.

Ex-students of BRKMAHS (2010 Madhyamik batch) organised a COVID relief fund and delivered much-needed oxygen, food, and necessary things to COVID-19 affected patients and their families of Baranagar and neighborhood areas.

Amphan relief services

BRKM started Amphan cyclone relief services to aid families affected by the Cyclone Amphan which wreaked havoc on 20 May 2020.

Others

BRKM distributed 500 blankets from 14 November 2021 to 9 January 2022 in Baranagar, Dakshineshwar and Harit. BRKM conducted eye camps at Harit on 7 August and 18 September 2022.

Cultural activities

Following cultural festivals and activities are held at school premises & Nivedita Krirangan in a befitting manner by the students of school in every year: 
 National Youth Day
 Birthday of Netaji
 Republic Day
 Saraswati Puja
 Birthday of Ramakrishna
 Maha Shivaratri
 Akshaya Tritiya (school foundation day)
 Rabindra Jayanti
 Independence Day
 Kali Puja
 Birthday of Sarada Devi
Devotees’ Conference is also once held in every year during annual festival of school.

Alumni association
Baranagore Ramakrishna Mission Ashrama High School Ex-students Reunion Celebration Committee is the name of alumni association committee of BRKMAHS. This committee every year celebrates reunion ceremony for ex-students of the school. They are connected with many social activities throughout the year.

Baranagore Ramakrishna Mission Ashrama Praktan Chhatra Samsad under the guidance of Ramakrishna Mission Ashrama, Baranagore, organised a "Voluntary Blood donation Camp" on 15 September 2019, in association with blood bank of Ramakrishna Mission Seva Pratishthan, Kolkata, as a part of the concluding – 125th Anniversary of Swami Vivekananda's Chicago Addresses at Sarada Bhawan. Total 51 units of blood were donated by ex-students of the ashrama high school, teachers, monastic members of different branch centres of the Ramakrishna Mission, Ashrama staff, volunteers and devotees. Baranagore Ramakrishna Mission Ashrama Praktan Chhatra Samsad Charitable Trust felicitated all the doctors who have been dedicatedly serving the poor & distressed patients throughout the year in the ashrama's medical unit & also in medical camps at various remote places.

Notable alumni

 Abhishek Chatterjee, Bengali film and television actor.
 Jeet Ganguly, score composer, music director and playback singer for Hindi and Bengali films.
 Shiboprosad Mukherjee, film director, writer and actor who works for Bengali films.
 Tathagata Mukherjee, Bengali film and television actor.
 Gautam Sarkar, ex-footballer, having represented SC East Bengal.
 Tanmoy Bhattacharya, politician, elected MLA of North Dum Dum constituency, 2016–2021.

Gallery

See also
 List of Ramakrishna Mission institutions
 List of schools in Kolkata

Notes

References

Further reading

External links

 
 BRKMAHS Ex-students Reunion Celebration Committee
Maps
 Geographic data related to Baranagore Ramakrishna Mission Ashrama High School at OpenStreetMap
Photos
 Photos of Baranagore Ramakrishna Mission Ashrama High School

 
Schools in North 24 Parganas district
Schools in Kolkata
High schools and secondary schools in West Bengal
Schools in Colonial India
Educational institutions established in 1912
Primary schools in West Bengal
Hinduism in Kolkata
Boys' schools in India
High schools and secondary schools in Kolkata
Schools affiliated with the Ramakrishna Mission
Day schools
1912 establishments in British India
1912 establishments in India
Baranagar
Academic institutions associated with the Bengal Renaissance
School buildings completed in the 20th century
Private schools in Kolkata
Charities based in India
Religious organizations established in 1912
British colonial architecture in India
Montessori schools in India
Organisations based in Kolkata
Articles containing video clips
20th century in Kolkata
20th-century architecture in India